Yan Can Cook is a Chinese oriented cooking show starring Chef Martin Yan that featured recipes for stir fried foods and an assortment of various other traditional Chinese meals and cooking techniques. The series first aired in Calgary, Alberta, Canada (CFAC-TV) in 1978 and later in San Francisco, California, United States in 1982 on PBS (KQED). Yan also wrote several cookbooks which serve as companions to these various television series.

Presentation style

Chef Yan's style of presentation was infused with (and today continues to feature) humor; during this program's original run he became known for his main catchphrase, "If Yan can cook, so can you, zai jian(goodbye in Mandarin Chinese)/zoi gin(goodbye in Cantonese)!", with which he signed off on each show. He used a second catchphrase, "Something fishy here! [sic]", used whenever he cooked seafood. One of his other trademarks was to chop food frantically with a sharp cleaver while grinning towards the camera. This show is shot on stage.

References

1982 American television series debuts
1980s American cooking television series
James Beard Foundation Award winners
Canadian cooking television series
Chinese cooking techniques